Green River was an American rock band formed in Seattle, Washington, in 1984. The band had very little commercial impact outside their native Seattle. The grunge style was featured both in Green River's own music and the music its members would create in future bands, including Mudhoney, Mother Love Bone, Temple of the Dog and Pearl Jam. Green River reunited for several live shows in 2008 and 2009.

History
In its first practice sessions in early 1984, Green River's members were vocalist Mark Arm, guitarist Steve Turner, drummer Alex Vincent (also known as Alex Shumway) and bassist Jeff Ament. Prior to joining Green River, they had played for a variety of rock, punk, and hardcore groups, often with overlapping lineups. Arm and Turner had played together in Mr. Epp and the Calculations and the Limp Richerds. Determined to start a new band together, they first recruited Vincent, whom Turner had briefly played with in Spluii Numa, as drummer, and then set about convincing Ament to join. He and Turner worked at the same Seattle coffeeshop, and Arm had befriended him after a DJ set by Ament at Metropolis, a local club. Ament had a low opinion of Mr. Epp, but agreed to join the new band due to Turner's persistence and Ament's frustration with Deranged Diction, his band  at the time. The first Green River rehearsal was at the Turner home on Mercer Island. Stone Gossard, a high school friend of Turner and Vincent, joined as a second guitarist shortly thereafter.

The idea for the name "Green River" came to both Arm and Turner independently. Arm has cited several possible inspirations — a local community college, the 1969 Creedence Clearwater song — but the most resonant association was with the Green River Killer, an infamous Washington state serial killer who was prominent in headlines at the time. To Alice Wheeler, a band photographer, the name reflected undercurrents of depression and danger that would come to characterize grunge; Turner later came to see it as "a dumb joke."

On June 23, 1984, Green River recorded their first demos at Reciprocal Recording. They were released on vinyl in 2016. By late 1984, the band was playing shows in and around Seattle. The band began production in December 1984 on its first record, Come on Down. By the time the band finished the record in mid-1985, Turner had left the group, citing his distaste with the rest of the band's heavy metal leanings. He was replaced by former Deranged Diction guitarist Bruce Fairweather.

In late 1985, the band embarked on its first nationwide tour to promote Come on Down. Release of the record was delayed, however, thus negating the purpose of the tour. From all accounts the experience was less than positive, though it helped cement alliances with other emerging American indie rock bands. Among them was Sonic Youth, who later quoted the song "Come on Down" on its own composition "Nevermind (What Was It Anyway)". After the tour, Come on Down was finally released by the New York-based Homestead Records. The record was released to little fanfare, and did not sell well. However it is often considered the first record to be released by a "grunge" band, as it predated both the Melvins debut EP and the Deep Six compilation album.

In 1986, the band continued to play in and around the Pacific Northwest to steadily larger crowds (especially in the band's hometown of Seattle). Early in the year, the now legendary Deep Six compilation album was released on the local C/Z Records label. Alongside two Green River songs, the compilation features the music of fellow Washington bands Malfunkshun, Melvins, Skin Yard, Soundgarden, and The U-Men. Kathleen C. Fennessy of AllMusic stated that the compilation "documents a formative period in Northwest rock history".

In June 1986, the band began production on its second EP, Dry as a Bone, with local producer Jack Endino. Green River chose to record Dry as a Bone for Bruce Pavitt's new label, Sub Pop. However, Pavitt couldn't afford to release it until the following year, and, as had happened with Come on Down, the record was delayed. In the meantime the band issued the one-off "Together We'll Never" single on the local Tasque Force Records label. Dry as a Bone was finally released through Sub Pop in July 1987, a full year after it was recorded. It was the new label's first non-compilation release. Dry as a Bone was promoted by Sub Pop as "ultra-loose GRUNGE that destroyed the morals of a generation". Steve Huey of AllMusic called it Green River's "strongest individual release...perfecting their sleazy, raucous fusion of '70s hard rock and post-hardcore punk".

Almost immediately following the release of Dry as a Bone, the group re-entered the studio to begin production on its first full-length album, Rehab Doll. Band in-fighting, though, took center stage over the music. A stylistic division developed between Ament and Gossard on one side, and Arm on the other. Ament and Gossard wanted to pursue a major-label deal, while Arm wanted to remain independent, viewing the duo as being too careerist. The in-fighting came to a head following an October 1987 show in Los Angeles, California. Apparently, without informing the group, Ament had filled the show's guest list with major label representatives, instead of the band's friends; nonetheless only two of the representatives appeared. On October 31, 1987, Ament, Gossard and Fairweather stated their desire to quit the band. Although the band members agreed to complete production of Rehab Doll during the next three months, Green River had by late October 1987 ceased as a band. Rehab Doll was released in June 1988. Ned Raggett of AllMusic called it "a record that sounded caught somewhere between grunge mania and metal/corp rock folly".

Reunions
A Green River reunion occurred on November 30, 1993 during a Pearl Jam concert in Las Vegas, Nevada. Participating in the reunion were Arm, Turner, Gossard, Ament and Chuck Treece, who filled in on drums for Vincent, who at that time was living in Japan. The band performed the songs "Swallow My Pride" and "Ain't Nothing to Do" before leaving the stage. Green River reunited for four shows in 2008. The line-up for the shows included Ament, Arm, Turner, Vincent, Gossard, and Fairweather. The first show was a warm-up show on July 10, 2008 at the Sunset Tavern in Seattle. The band next played on July 13, 2008 at Marymoor Park near Seattle to honor Sub Pop's 20th anniversary.

Band members
Mark Arm – vocals (1984–1988, 1993, 2008–09)
Steve Turner – guitar, backing vocals (1984–1985, 1993, 2008–2009)
Alex Vincent – drums, percussion (1984–1988, 2008–09)
Jeff Ament – bass, backing vocals (1984–1988, 1993, 2008–09)
Stone Gossard – guitar, backing vocals (1984–1988, 1993, 2008–09)
Bruce Fairweather – guitar, backing vocals (1985–1988, 2008–2009)
 Chuck Treece – drums (1993)

Timeline

Discography

Studio albums

Live albums

Demo albums

Compilations

Extended plays

Singles

Other appearances

See also
List of alternative rock artists

References

External links
Sub Pop's Green River page

Alternative rock groups from Washington (state)
Grunge musical groups
C/Z Records artists
Homestead Records artists
Musical groups established in 1984
Musical groups disestablished in 1988
Musical groups reestablished in 2008
Musical groups disestablished in 2009
Musical groups from Seattle
1984 establishments in Washington (state)
Sub Pop artists